The northern dwarf skink (Menetia maini) is a species of skink found in Northern Territory, Queensland, and Western Australia in Australia.

References

Menetia
Reptiles described in 1976
Skinks of Australia
Endemic fauna of Australia
Taxa named by Glen Milton Storr